Agnes Flanagan Chapel is a chapel on the Lewis & Clark College campus, in Portland, Oregon. The building was designed by Paul Thiry, completed in 1968, and officially dedicated in February 1969.

Design
The chapel was built in a 16-side design with stained glass windows depicting stories from the Book of Genesis. It has seating for 650 people.

Due to the chapel's 16 sides, it is home to a specially-designed pipe organ which hangs from its ceiling.

References

External links
 

1960s architecture in the United States
University and college buildings completed in 1968
Lewis & Clark College buildings
University and college chapels in the United States